The Oxford University Rugby Football Club (Oxford University RFC or OURFC) is the rugby union club of the University of Oxford. The club contests The Varsity Match every year against Cambridge University at Twickenham.

History

Men's team 

The University of Oxford RFC was founded in 1869, fifteen months before the creation of the Rugby Football Union. The first Varsity Match was played in February 1872 in Oxford at 'The Parks', the following year the return game was played in Cambridge on Parker's Piece. In 1874 it was decided that the game be played on a neutral ground. Oxford, like rivals Cambridge, have supplied hundreds of players to national teams, and was key in spreading the sport of rugby throughout Britain as past students brought the game back to their home counties. The very first international player to be capped whilst at Oxford was Cecil Boyle, who represented England in 1873, one season before Cambridge University. In 1951 OURFC became the first Western rugby team to tour Japan after World War II.

OURFC currently has 3 Men's teams: 1st XV Blues, 2nd XV Greyhounds and 3rd XV Whippets. All three teams play Varsity matches against their respective Cambridge opponents. Additionally, there is also a Men's U20s squad which contest their own Varsity Match alongside the Women's 2nd XV.

Major Stanley's Match 

Major R. V. Stanley was an Oxford local who took a hearty interest in the development of OURFC, becoming its first representative on the RFU Committee 1903–27. The first recorded Stanley's Match took place in 1919, after the 1914 match was cancelled due to the outbreak of World War I. An invitational squad, similar to the Barbarians, the Major Stanley's XV historically drew in big name players such as Thomas Voyce and William Wavell Wakefield. Major Stanley's Match is an annual fixture played in preparation of the Varsity Match and recent Stanley's XVs have included Cardiff RFC. In 2019, the centenary year of the first Major Stanley's fixture, the Women's Blues faced the first ever Major Stanley's Women's XV.

Women's team 

Oxford University WRFC was founded in 1988 and has been playing Cambridge University WRUFC annually since. The first women's Varsity was won by Cambridge; Oxford currently have 20 Varsity victories to Cambridge's 13. Notable players include Sue Day (St John's), who has won 59 England caps.

As of May 2015, Oxford University RFC and Oxford University WRFC have officially merged into one University RFC. 2015 also marked the first year that the women's Varsity Match was held at Twickenham on the same day as the men's game. OURFC Women's 1st XV compete in BUCS Premiership South.

Honours

 Hawick Sevens
 Champions (1):  1925
Oxford University Greyhounds:
Oxfordshire RFU County Cup winners: 1976
Oxford University Women's Blues:
 BUCS Vase Champions 2017
 BUCS Vase Runners Up 2019

Notable former players
Oxford University RFC has fielded over 300 international rugby players, many of whom were first Capped during their time playing for the club.

Scotland internationalists

The following former Oxford University players have represented Scotland at full international level.

  George Aitken
  David McLaren Bain
  John Bannerman
  David Bell
  William Berkley
  Charles Berry
  William Bolton
  John Boswell
  Fletcher Buchanan
  Pat Burnet
  Alexander Cairns
  George Cawkwell
  Paul Clauss
  Mac Cooper
  Ian Coutts
  Jack Crabbie
  Gerard Crole
  George Cunningham
  Simon Danielli
  Hamish Dawson
  Maurice Dickson
  Grahame Donald
  Bill Donaldson
  Dan Drysdale
  Denoon Duncan
  Ewen Fergusson
  Charles Fleming
  Hector Forsayth
  Henry Gedge
  Augustus Grant-Asher
  Charles Grieve
  Thomas Hart
  Chick Henderson
  Nelson Henderson
  Gurth Hoyer-Millar
  Kenneth Jackson
  Norman Kennedy
  Peter Kininmonth
  George Campbell Lindsay
  Bertie Lorraine
  Eric Loudoun-Shand
  Donald MacDonald
  Chris Mackintosh
  Pat MacLachlan
  John Marshall
  Patrick Munro
  Thomas Arthur Nelson
  William Renwick
  William Roughead
  Douglas Schulze
  Tennant Sloan
  Allan Smith
  Ian Smith
  Ken Spence
  Peter Stagg
  Stephen Steyn
  Malcolm Swan
  Edward Taylor
  Frans ten Bos
  Bruce Thomson
  William Thomson
  Frederick Harding Turner
  Johnnie Wallace
  Archibald Walker
  James Walker
  Mike Walker
  David Whyte
  Stewart Wilson
  Eric Templeton Young

Wales internationalists

The following former Oxford University players have represented Wales at full international level.

  Gareth Baber
  Onllwyn Brace
  Ian Buckett
  Gareth Davies
  David Evans
  Walter Rice Evans
  Gwyn Francis
  Billy Geen
  Vivian Jenkins
  Conway Rees
  John Strand-Jones
  Will Rowlands

England internationalists

The following former Oxford University players have represented England at full international level.

  Stuart Barnes
  Ernest Cheston
  Edward Fraser
  Phil de Glanville
  Simon Halliday
  Alexander Sergeevich Obolensky
  Alan Rotherham(IRB Hall of Fame inductee) 
  Richard Sharp
  Victor Ubogu
  Derek Wyatt

Ireland internationalists

The following former Oxford University players have represented Ireland at full international level.

  David Humphreys
  Niall Malone
   Brian Smith

Other nationalities

  Raymond Burse
  Nick Civetta
  Troy Coker
  Philip Crowe
  Andrew Durutalo
  Bob Egerton
  Eric Fry
  Thomas Gubb
  Toshiyuki Hayashi
  Gary Hein
  David Kirk
  Nick Mallett
  Stan McKeen
  Katsuhiko Oku
  Anton Oliver
  Gareth Rees(IRB Hall of Fame inductee)
  Joe Roff
   Brian Smith
  Kevin Tkachuk
   Johnnie Wallace

References

External links

 
 The Varsity Match

 
English rugby union teams
Rugby
1869 establishments in England
Rugby clubs established in 1869
University and college rugby union clubs in England
Sport at the University of Oxford
Rugby union in Oxfordshire